Maurice Gehri (born? died?) was a Swiss and in 1921 the Delegate of the International Committee of the Red Cross during the Gemlik-Yalova Peninsula massacres. Together with an inter allied commission he participated in a humanitarian investigation to the events and wrote a report about it.

Notes

Red Cross personnel
Swiss humanitarians
Year of birth missing
Year of death missing